Yeisy Soto (born ) is a Colombian volleyball player. She is part of the Colombia women's national volleyball team. On club level she played for Liga Bolivarense in 2015.

References

1996 births
Living people
Colombian women's volleyball players
Place of birth missing (living people)
21st-century Colombian women